The Zimbabwe Music Awards (ZIMA) is an annual award ceremony to acknowledge and honor musical excellence and creativity in Zimbabwean music.

References

External links
 https://zimmusicawards.co.zw
 

Zimbabwean music
African music awards
Zimbabwean music awards